Line 2 of the Dongguan Rail Transit is a subway line in Dongguan. It opened on 27 May 2016. Construction of Line 2 began in 2010.

Opening timeline

Stations

Future Development

Phase 3
Phase 3 of Line 2 is 17.1 km in length with 9 stations. Construction started in August 2022. It is expected to open in 2027.

Station list
 Humen North (虎门北)
 Humen Avenue (虎门大道)
 Humen Jinjie Road (虎门金捷路)
 Humen Guangming Road (虎门光明路)
 Binhaiwan (滨海湾)
 Qingchuangcheng (青创城)
 Gang'ao Ferry Terminal (港澳码头)
 Jiaoyiwan West (交椅湾西)
 Jiaoyiwan (交椅湾) (interchange with the Northern extension of Shenzhen Metro Line 20 in long-term planning)

See also
 Guangzhou Metro
 FMetro
 Shenzhen Metro
 List of rapid transit systems
 Metro systems by annual passenger rides

References

External links
 Dongguan Rail Transit – official website 

Dongguan Rail Transit lines
2016 establishments in China
Railway lines opened in 2016